Adam Ryczkowski (born 30 April 1997) is a Polish professional footballer who plays as a winger for Chojniczanka Chojnice.

Club career

Ryczkowski started his career with Legia Warsaw.

External links

References

1997 births
People from Węgrów County
Sportspeople from Masovian Voivodeship
Living people
Polish footballers
Poland youth international footballers
Association football midfielders
Association football forwards
Legia Warsaw II players
Legia Warsaw players
Wigry Suwałki players
Chojniczanka Chojnice players
Górnik Zabrze players
Motor Lublin players
Ekstraklasa players
I liga players
II liga players
III liga players